Eglė the Queen of Serpents, alternatively Eglė the Queen of Grass Snakes, is a Lithuanian folk tale, first published by M. Jasewicz in 1837.

Eglė the Queen of Serpents is one of the best-known Lithuanian fairy tales with many references to the Baltic mythology. Over a hundred slightly diverging versions of the plot have been collected. Its mythological background has been an interest of Lithuanian and foreign researchers of Indo-European mythology; Gintaras Beresnevičius considered it being a Lithuanian theogonic myth. The tale features not only human–reptile shapeshifting, but irreversible human–tree shapeshifting as well. Numerology is also evident in the tale, such as twelve sons, three daughters, three days, three tricks, three weeks of feast, nine years under the oath of marriage, three tasks given to Eglė by her husband to fulfill and nine days of visits.

Published sources
According to researcher Svetlana Ryzhakova, the tale first appeared in print in 1837, published by one M. Jasevičiaus or M. Jasavičius, in the supplement Biruta.

The tale was also collected by Polish writer Józef Ignacy Kraszewski and published in his historical work Litwa.

Etymology

Ĕglė is a popular female name in Lithuania. It is also a noun meaning tree species spruce (Latin: Picea) and fir, with cognates in other Baltic languages: Latvian egle 'spruce, fir', and Old Prussian addle 'spruce, fir'.

One of the main characters in this fairy tale is a grass snake (Lithuanian: žaltys), but because it seems to inhabit the sea-adjacent lagoon (Lithuanian: marios), the word may actually refer either to a mythical aquatic snake or a European eel (Anguilla anguilla).

Synopsis

The story can be subdivided into a number of sections each having parallels with motifs of other folk tales, yet a combination of them is unique.

A young maiden named Eglė discovers a grass snake in the sleeve of her blouse after bathing with her two sisters. The exact location of their bathing remains undisclosed. Speaking in a human voice, the grass snake repeatedly agrees to go away only after Eglė pledges herself to him in exchange for him leaving her clothes. Shocked, upset, hesitant (how can she, a person, marry a grass snake?), but in a hurry to get rid of the persistent snake-like reptile, Eglė agrees to marry, while not fully understanding the potential consequences and the gravity of her situation. Then after three days, thousands of grass snakes march into the yard of her parents' house. They come to claim Eglė as their master's bride and their future queen, but are tricked by her relatives each time. A domesticated goose, a sheep and then a cow are given instead of the bride to the legion of the grass snakes, but once they start a journey back home, the cuckoo, who is sitting in the birch tree, warns them about the deceit. Enraged grass snakes return for a final time and threaten everyone with dry year, deluge and famine. Finally, they take the non-fake bride, Eglė, to the bottom of the sea lagoon to their king.

Instead of seeing a serpent or a grass snake on the seashore, Eglė meets her bridegroom Žilvinas, who appears to be a handsome man - the Grass Snake Prince. They transfer to the nearby island, and from there to the underground underneath the sea, where a nicely decorated palace is located - Eglė's new home for eternity. The feast is going on for three weeks, and thereafter the couple lives happily together. Eglė bears four children (three sons (Ąžuolas (Oak), Uosis (Ash) and Beržas (Birch)) and one youngest daughter Drebulė (Aspen)). Eglė almost forgets about her homeland, but one day, after being questioned by her oldest son Ąžuolas about her parents, she decides to visit her home. However, Žilvinas (perhaps intuitively being afraid to lose his wife or sensing his fate) denies her permission to leave the Grass Snake palace. In order to be allowed to visit home, Eglė is required to fulfill three impossible tasks: to spin a never-ending tuft of silk, wear down a pair of iron shoes and to bake a pie with no utensils. After she gets an advice from the sorceress (a potential referral to the Lady of the Sea or Lady of the Cave) and succeeds in completing these three tasks, Žilvinas reluctantly lets Eglė and the children go. Prior to their departure, he instructs them how to call him from the depths of the sea and asks not to tell this secret to anyone else.

After meeting the long lost family member, Eglė's relatives do not wish to let her return to the sea and decide to kill Žilvinas. First, his sons are threatened and beaten with the scourge by their uncles, in attempt to make them disclose how to summon their father; however, they remain silent and do not betray him. Finally, a frightened daughter tells them the grass snake summoning chant:

"Žilvinas, dear Žilvinėlis,
If (you're) alive – may the sea foam milk
If (you're) dead – may the sea foam blood…"

All twelve brothers of Eglė call Žilvinas the Grass Snake from the sea and kill him using scythes. They do not say a word to their sister about the horrible crime they have just committed.  After nine days, Eglė arrives at the seashore and calls her husband, but unfortunately only the foams of blood return from the sea. When Eglė hears her dead husband's voice and discovers how her beloved has died, as a punishment for betrayal she whispers an enchantment, which turns her fragile fearful daughter into a quaking aspen.  Thereafter she turns her sons into strong trees - an oak, an ash and a birch. Finally, Eglė herself turns into a spruce.

Translations
The tale was translated as Spruce, Queen of the Grass Snakes. Hungarian scholar  called it Egle (Silver Pine), the Snake Goddess and Egle (Silver Fir), the Snake Queen.

The tale was translated into German language as Egle, die Schlangenkönigin by German professor  in his book of Lithuanian folktales, and as Das Weib des Schlangenmannes ("The Wife of the Snake-Man"), and published in Mitteilungen der Litauischen literarischen Gesellschaft.

Analysis

In folkloristics 
This tale is classified, in the Aarne–Thompson–Uther Index, as tale type ATU 425M, "The Snake as Bridegroom" (formerly "Bathing Girl's garments kept [until promise of marriage with aquatic being]"). These tales are closely connected to type ATU 425 ("Search for the Lost Husband"), ATU 425A ("Animal as Bridegroom"), ATU 425B ("Cupid and Psyche" or "Son of the Witch") and ATU 425C ("Beauty and the Beast"). As such, some versions avert the tragic ending by following the narrative of other tale types, like ATU 425A and ATU 425C.

According to Stith Thompson's reworked folktale classification, tale type AaTh 425M involves a magical formula or incantation to summon the serpent husband. This formula is learned by others, who draw the serpentine being out of its hideout to kill it.

In Lithuanian scholarship
The tale is one of the most researched in Lithuanian scholarship, under different approaches, since "it represents the old Lithuanian worldview".

The tale has become the object of scholarly interest of ethnologist . In his analysis of Lithuanian folktales (published in 1936), he previously classified the tale as 425D*, Žalčio žmona ("The Girl as Wife to a Snake"), with 27 variants reported until then.

The story has also been considered an oikotype, i.e., a form of the tale that is specific to a certain region (in this case, the Baltic geographical area).

Folklorist Norbertas Vėlius has also developed an academic interest in the narrative and analysed its elements ("the dual nature of Egle, the attributes of the snake, the types of plants") in relation to the folklore of other countries.

The serpent husband
In another version of the tale, the king of snakes is named Žaltys, they live in his palace at the bottom of the sea, and the tale ends with the transformation of her four children and herself into trees: her into a pine tree, her sons into an oak, an ash, and a birch, and her daughter into a weeping willow. The name of the serpent husband may also vary between tellings: Žilvinas, Zilvynas, Zelvynas, or Žilvytis.

Researcher Galina Kabakova cites that most variants feature a serpent husband: a snake, a boa, a winged serpent, even a Hydra-like dragon. In other variants, he is identified as the king of snakes or the spirit of the waters who lives in an underwater palace located in a lake, a river or a lagoon.

Scholar Jack Zipes provided another description of the tale type, wherein, besides the serpent, a seal, a dragon or sea monster may steal the clothes of the bathing maiden.

The human–animal relationship 
The main storyline (marriage of human woman with snake that steals her clothing) is said to belong to a mythological background about snakes that may be very archaic to the European continent. It is also said that the ancient Lithuanians revered the grass snake (žaltys). Under this lens, the grass snake could be seen as a totemic ancestor, akin to the swan maiden, who plays the role of ancestress of many peoples.

According to Bernard Sergent, "human–animal marriage is an union that is too remote as incest is a too close one. Compared to a balanced marriage, between humans but from another clan or another village, that is to say–depending on the society–within the framework of a well measured endogamy or exogamy, incest transgresses the norm because it is an exaggerated endogamy, and animal marriage transgresses it because it is an exaggerated exogamy."

Lithuanian scholarship seems to agree with this assessment: the snake is the ruler of waters and represents a chaotic world. Its liaison with a human woman, which produces children, violates the boundaries between the world of land and the world of water and, by killing the snake, the natural order (that is, separation between land and water) can be restored. By using the magical incantation to summon the snake bridegroom, Egle builds a bridge between her world and the aquatic one (or an underground, chthonic realm).

Other interpretations focus on the intergroup marriage aspect of the story: Egle's family (brothers) would then represent male relatives fighting against a male from another family or clan to rescue their only sister, by torturing their nephews and niece (the fruits of this "spurious" union). Balticist , citing  and Meletinsky, described the tragic fate of Egle's family as consequence of tribalism: her brothers kill the 'animal' husband because he belongs to another tribe or group, and, for bearing his sons, Egle and her children must also disappear.

Another view, spoused by scholar Eugenijus Žmuida, is that the tale harks back to a myth about a maiden offered as the bride to a snake (who represents a deity of waters). At first, she is hesitant and afraid, but relents and, after seeing that the snake can change into a handsome man, accepts him wholeheartedly. Žmuida also suggests that tales that lack family drama and friction might be the original forms of the story.

Possible antiquity 
The tale about a snake spouse is also considered by Russian scholarship to be a "common Slavic" or "pan-Slavic" fairy tale, with possible Indo-European origins. Another line of scholarship states that the tale refers to an ancient "Balto-Slavic totemic myth".

A quantitative study, published by folklorist Sara Graça da Silva and anthropologist Jamshid J. Tehrani in 2016, seemed to indicate that the tale type shows a certain antiquity: based on a phylogenetic model, both researchers estimated that the ATU 425M type belongs to an "ancestral tale corpora" of the Balto-Slavic languages.

Although its ultimate time and place of origin cannot be settled with certainty, the Lithuanian myth has been compared with similar stories found among Native American peoples (Wayampi, Yahgan and Coos), which could be the result of an inherited Ancient North Eurasian motif featuring a woman marrying an aquatic animal, violating human laws on exogamy and connecting the terrestrial and aquatic worlds.

Variants
Although it can be considered a tale type developed in the Baltic area, since most of the variants have been recorded there, variants are reported by scholar Leonardas Sauka to have been collected in nearby countries: 23 variants in Estonia (near Lake Peipus); 150 Lithuanian versions; 89 Latvian versions; 28 from Russia; 22 from Belarus; 6 in Ukraine; 3 from Poland; 2 from Bulgaria. Variants have also been found from Tatar (4 tales) and Kazakh (1 version) sources. Altogether, the variants collected outside Lithuania and Latvia, from 11 countries, amount to 106 versions. The tale is also said to be known in Germany, Finland and among the "Cheremis" (Mari people).

Other variations lie in the secret code the wife learns from her snake husband, and in the fate of the heroine and their children (sometimes all girls; sometimes all boys): they are either transformed into trees or into birds and disappear forever. Some stories mention that the king of the grass snakes was wearing an amber crown or that he lived in an amber palace - a motif that recalls another Baltic fairy tale: Jūratė and Kastytis.

According to researcher Galina Kabakova, the fate of the children at the end of the tale is important to determine the origin of that particular variant (based on a geographical method): in the main Lithuanian versions, mother and children are transformed into trees, a motif that occurs in versions collected from the Belarus's border between Poland and Lithuania, and in Russian versions collected in Lithuania. On the other hand, if the tale ends with the transformation of the family into birds or reptiles, it is a tale from East Slavic origin.

Baltic region
The tale type is recognized as being "most at home in the Balto-Slavic regions".

Lithuania
According to scholar Norbertas Vėlius, the tale is "more common" in the eastern area of Lithuania, where "more than two thirds" of the variants have been collected. Variants collected at East Lithuania show the transformation of the children into birds. Following a less mythological approach, scholar Endre Bójtar suggested that its diffusion across Lithuania owes to the local snake cult, recorded in historical sources.

In a Lithuanian variant, Das Mädchen und die Schlange ("The Girl and the Snake"), a widow lives with her daughter in a house at the beach. One day, the girl is sent to wash some clothes at the beach when a wave crashes and carries them away. The girl begins to cry, but a voice tells her it will return the clothes if she becomes the voice's wife. She accepts it and goes back home. That evening, a giant snake comes out of the sea and knocks at the girl's door. She opens the door and answers to the snake's wishes: to be given food and to sleep next to her in her bed. The next day, the snake asks her to prepare the oven and to throw it in the fire. The girl obeys and a human prince appears. He explains she disenchanted him and he will make her his wife as the "Queen of the Seas" ("du wirst fortan Königin des Meeres sein"), in his palace in the middle of the sea.

Latvia
In Latvia the tale is known as Žalčio nuotaka or Zalkša līgava ("The Grass-Snake's Wife"). According to the Latvian Folktale Catalogue, the heroine curses her sons to become trees and herself to become a cuckoo.

In a Latvian tale, translated into Russian as "Невеста ужа" ("The Bride of the Snake") and into English as The Sea Snake's Bride, three girls run to the beach to play in the water. The third girl leaves the water and searches for her clothes, only to find a snake lying on top of them. The snake makes the girl give her ring in exchange for the garments, and slithers back into the water. Three weeks later, the snake comes to get his bride in a grand golden carriage. Her family tries to trick him twice, first with a goose, then with a she-goat. The third time, he gets his bride and takes her to his underwater kingdom. The next two years, her mother goes to the sea shore and asks about her daughter. A toad and a crab jump out of the water to tell the woman the girl is doing fine. On the third year, the girl herself visits her family with her children, then returns to the water.

In another tale, Das Schloß des Meereskönigs or "Дворец морского царя" ("The Palace of the Sea King"), the son of the Sea King gets curious about the land above the sea and decides to visit it. One day, he meets a despondent fisherman on the shore, who laments to the sea prince that he has not caught any fishes. The sea prince tells he will help him, on the condition that the fisherman gives him the first thing that is on the shore (which happens to be the fisherman's only daughter). The girl is wreathing a flower garland that is swept off by the wind and falls on the sea. The sea prince takes her to his kingdom, marries her and she gives birth to two boys. Years pass, and the girl is missing life on the land. Her husband agrees to let her up on the shore, but she has to eat a loaf of bread (that does not diminish) and wear out a pair of shoes (that do not wear out). A little bird gives her a clue on how to fulfill both tasks and she tricks her husband. The girl visits her family, but her brothers consult with a nearby witch, who reveals the sons know how to summon their father. The girl's brothers torture their nephews in the bath house and they tell their uncles the secret command. The uncles go to the beach, summon the sea prince and kill him with spears. When the girl goes to the shore to return to her husband, she summons him and sees his head floating in the water. Her sons change into water and she returns to her human family.

In a Latvian tale from Ansis Lerhis-Puškaitis's (lv) collection, from Jelgava, translated into Hungarian with the title Hogyan lett a kakukk? ("How did the cuckoo appear?"), a mother finds a louse in her house, fattens it and make a pair of shoes for her daughter. Her suitors are to discover what material the shoes are made of (tale type AaTh 621, "The Louseskin"). A water snake (a crested newt, in the original) announces it is a louseskin and marries the girl, taking her to its underwater palace. After some years, the girl wants to visit her human family, but the water snake sets a task: to wear down some pairs of iron shoes. She does and takes her three children with her. At the end of the tale, when she discovers the dead husband, she commands the elder son to become an oak, the middle child, a girl, to be a linden tree; the youngest into another tree; and herself into a cuckoo, to ever sigh over her lost love.

Finnic languages

Estonia
The tale type is reported from Southern Estonia, "especially in the Setu region". According to Estonian folklorists (who worked in conjunction with the Lithuanians), the Estonian archives registered 34 variants of the tale type, and, at the end of the tale, the serpent's wife becomes a birch or aspen and her children turn into bark or leaves.

In an Estonian tale titled Ussi naine or Ussi naene ("The Snake's Wife"), the maiden bathes with her sisters by the sea, the snake refuses to return her clothes, the heroine gives birth to daughters that become different tree species at the end of the tale.

In an Estonian tale translated into Hungarian as A királylány bocskora, a king prepares two mantles, one made from louseskin, the other from flea skin. He sets a riddle for any suitors: whoever guesses the right material of both mantles, shall marry the princess. Human suitors test their skills. A snake slithers from beneath the well, goes to the king's court, and guesses the right answer. The princess is given to the snake as wife and goes with the animal to its home. The princess bears the snake man three daughters and goes to visit her family. Back to her castle, the princess's brothers express their distate about their snake brother-in-law, and question their nieces about their home life. The youngest child reveals how they reach their house: their mother goes to the edge of a lake, sings a song and the snake father appears in a boat. The brothers go to the lake, summon the snake with the song and kill him as soon as he appears. Some time later, the princess takes her daughters and prepares to return home by summoning her snake husband, the boat appears dirtied with her husband's blood. The princess asks which of her daughters spilled the secret song (the youngest), and curses herself to become a birch tree, and her daughters to turn into parts of the tree (foliage, tree bark and membrane).

In an Estonian tale published by folklorist Oskar Loorits with the title Die Schlangenbraut ("The Snake's Bride"), a mother consults with a wise man the fate of her daughters: her two elders shall marry later, but the youngest shall soon meet her intended mate, a snake. Meanwhile, the girls are bathing in the lake. When they leave to get her clothes, the youngest finds a snake on her garments, which promises to return them if she becomes his wife. She agrees to his proposal and the snake comes later to take her to his underground palace. Years into their marriage, the snake takes off the snakeskin to become a man, and they have three daughters. One day, their daughters wish to visit their grandparents. The snake father allows them to go back to land and teaches his wife a song to open a passage back to mainland. Before they enter her parents' house, the girl warns her daughters to keep quiet about their life. The grandfather asks his grandchildren about where they live; the youngest girl tells him about the snake husband and the magical song. The grandfather goes to the lake with a rifle, summons the snake and shoots him. The next day, the girl and her daughters go back to the lake. She summons her husband three times, but he does not respond. Sensing something wrong, she inquires her daughters about it: the youngest confesses. The girl begins to cry and becomes a birch tree, her two elder daughters birch bark and the youngest a trembling leaf.

In a tale from the Lutsi Estonians collected by linguist Oskar Kallas with the name Ussiks nõiutud mees ("The Man Enchanted to be a Snake"), a couple prays for a son, and God gives them a snake. When the snake is older, he goes to a neighbour to court his daughters. He marries the elder in church. During the wedding festivities, the snake climbs onto her lap, but the girl shoos him away. On the wedding night, the snake kills her. This happens again with the middle sister. As for the youngest, she treats him with kindness and, on the wedding night, he takes off his snakeskin to become a handsome man. The man moves out of his parents's home with his wife to an island in the middle of the sea. They live together and have three sons. One day, the man's wife wants to visit her brothers, and the man teaches her a magic command to move from the island to the continent, while also warning her not to tell anything of their life to her brothers. She takes her sons to visit her brothers, and the brothers pry the children for anything. The youngest son reveals the secret command to his uncles. The uncles go to the beach, sing the song to summon the snake man and kill him. The man's wife goes to the beach and repeats the song to summon her husband, but he does not appear. She then questions her sons if any of them told anything about the secret song, and the youngest answers that he did. Crying, the girl becomes a birch near the shore, while her children become trees.

German scholar  collected an untitled Estonian tale: a king has a daughter and three sons. One day, the princess finds a louse in her father's hair, who decides to fatten the bug and use its hide as part of a suitor riddle: whoever guesses the nature of the hide shall marry the princess. A large snake comes to the castle and guesses it right, then takes the princess with him as his bride to his abode in the sea. To the princess's surprise, the snake becomes a man at night, and after a year she gives birth to a son. The girl wishes to go back home to show her father the child, and, despite some reservations, the snake husband allowslet her to pay him a visit, by teaching a spell to access her watery home. Back to the castle, she spends some time with her brothers, who insist to know how their sister can return to the snake's home. After much insistence, the brothers learn of the secret command and go to the seashore. The two elder brothers try to summon the snake brother-in-law, but he recognizes their voices do not belong to his wife. However, the princess's younger brother mimics her voice and tricks the snake into coming out of the water, only to be beheaded by the princess's brothers. Some time later, the princess and her child come to the seashore and try to call out to the snake husband, to no avail, so the princess turns into a Maserbirke (a type of birch tree) and her son into a duck.

Finland
Tale type 425M is known in Finland as Uuza Vedenkuningas ("Uuza the King of Waters"), according to the Finnish Folktale Catalogue, established by scholar Pirkko-Liisa Rausmaa. Rausmaa also stated that the tale type was rare ("Harvinaisesta", in the original) in Finland, with its four variants collected from Ingria (Finnish: Inkeri).

Author  collected a variant from the village of Voloitsa (Valyanitsy), on the Soikino peninsula. In this tale, titled Wie die Trauerbirke entstanden ist ("How the weeping birch came to be"), a rich man finds a louse on his daughter's hair, fattens it, kills it and makes a pair of shoes out of its hide. He then announces a contest to all prospective suitors: to guess the material of his daughter's shoes. A woman appears from the lake, becomes an old man and enters the court. She guesses correctly and takes the girl as daughter-in-law and wife for her son. Three years pass, and the girl has been living in a splendid underwater castle, but begins to long for home. Her husband agrees to let her visit her family with her son, teaches her a spell and give her gold to gift her family. She reaches home and spends some time there. Her brothers want to kill the underwater husband, so they leave early and wait by the lake with wooden bats. Their sister goes to the lake shore and summons her husband. As soon as he emerges from the lake, the brothers jump out of the hiding spot and beat the husband to death. The girl becomes a weeping birch and her son a tree branch.

Eastern Europe
Professor Jack V. Haney stated that variants of type 425M appear "frequently recorded among the Russians", but "less frequently by Belarusians and Ukrainians".

Galina Kabakova notes that, among the East Slavic populations, the tale type ATU 425M assumes the features of an etiological tale: as remarked by professor Natalie Kononenko, it shows the origins of the cuckoo, the lark and the nightingale. In addition, in these variants, the mother-in-law is the one that kills the snake husband.

English scholar A. H. Wratislaw collected the tale Transformation into a Nightingale and a Cuckoo from "Little Russia" in his Sixty Folk-Tales from Exclusively Slavonic Sources. In this tale, a human maiden falls in love with a snake and they both live in an underground palace made of crystal. She becomes the mother of twins (a girl and a boy). Her old mother seizes a sickle and "rushed into the country". The maiden "saw she had manifest death before her" and, by her command, orders her children to become birds: the boy a nightingale and the girl a cuckoo, and it is implied that a dead nettle is what remained of her.

Ukraine
Researcher Galina Kabakova translated and published a variant from Ukraine titled Les coucous, les alouettes et les reptiles. She also cited variants wherein the daughter becomes an ortie (nettle) or a cuckoo, and the son becomes a basilisk or a nightingale.

Poland
A variant from Poland has been translated into English with the title Egle and Zaltis.

According to scholarship, variants collected in northern Poland, in the ancient territories of the Yotvingians (Jatvings), show the Égle's twelve brothers are eventually punished by Baltic thunder god Perkūnas.

Bronisław Sokalski published another Polish variant with the title Król wężów ("The Serpent King"). In this tale, three sisters are bathing in the water. The two elders leave, while the youngest, named Lilla, tries to find her dress and sees a snake on it. The animal makes her promise to marry him in exchange for the dress. The next day, two snakes come to her house to fetch her to their master.

Russia
The tale type is known in Russia as Zhena Uzha ("The Snake's Wife"), or The Grass Snake's Wife. Researcher Varvara Dobrovolskaya states that variants in Russia were collected in Kursk, Bashkiria, Ryazan, Voronezh and in East Siberia by the Lena river.

According to Russian scholarship, the tale type 425M sometimes merges with ATU 703, "The Snow-Maiden" in many Russian variants.

British scholar William Ralston Shedden-Ralston translated a variant collected by Erlenwein from the Tula Government. In this variant, The Water Snake or Ujak, an old woman's daughter went to bathe with other girls in the pond. When they finished bathing, a snake appeared and hid the maiden's shift in exchange for her hand in marriage. The girl, dismissing the snake's fanciful notion, agreed to anyway. Some time later, a "troop" of snakes came to the maiden's house to force her to fulfill her promise. The snakes escorted her out of the house and into her fiancée's underwater palace. Three years passed and she returned to her mother's house with two little children, a boy and a girl. When conversing with her mother, the maiden unwittingly revealed her husband's name (Osip) and the incantation to summon him. After she put her daughter and grandchildren to bed, the old woman uttered the incantation, drew forth the snake husband, in human form, out of the palace and decapitated him with an axe. The next morning, the maiden returned to the pond and, after realizing her mother's heinous act, condemned her daughter to become a wren, her son a nightingale and herself a cuckoo.

Professor Jack Haney published another Russian variant, titled The Lake Beetle as Groom. In this tale, a beetle appears on the maiden's dress and proposes to her. She is later taken to the lake. The narrative tells that the human maiden marries another "kidnapped" person that was living with the "lake people", named Osip Tsarevich. At the end of the tale, after her mother kills Osip, the maiden curses her son into a dove, her daughter into a swallow and herself into a cuckoo.

In a tale collected from a Karelian source with the title "Парень-гад" ("The Reptile Beloved"), twelve maidens go to bathe in the sea and leave their clothes on the shore. After they bathe and play in the water, the maidens return to fetch their clothes, when one of them notices there is a reptile lying on theirs. The reptile promises to return her clothes if she agrees to marry her, to which she answers yes so she can get her clothes back. The girl returns home that sma eevning and the reptile comes to take his bride. The girl and her mother board up the doors and windows and wait for a sudden storm to pass. This happens for the next two nights, until the girl agrees to go with the reptile. She marries the reptile, which lies on the rivers, and she has two children with him when he becomes human. Suddenly, the girl's mother asks her how she can summon her reptile husband, and the girl reveals the secret. The woman takes a scythe and goes to the river to summon the reptile husband to kill him. The girl rushes back to the lake and, seeing her dead husband, curses her two children to become white swans and herself a gray cuckoo.

Russian scholarship states that a tradition in Pskov holds that the daughter of the snake husband turns into a frog.

Another Russian variant of tale type ATU 425M was collected in Tver with the title "Уженька и Маша" ("Uzhenka and Masha").

Belarus
According to scholarship, only one Belarusian variant of the tale contains the daughter's transformation into a frog.

Mari people 
In a tale from the Mari people titled "Слепая любовь" ("Blind Love"), some sisters go to bathe in the water. The youngest leaves and tries to find her garments, but a snake is lying on top of them and will only return her the clothes with the promise of marriage. She marries the snake. Three years later, the girl visits her family carrying her two children in tow, a son and a daughter. Her mother learns the secret command to summon the snake husband (called Isai Isanych) and kills the husband with a scythe. The girl sees the dead husband and commands the son to become a lark and the daughter a cuckoo, while she is washed away by the waves, never to be seen again.

Chuvash people
In a tale attributed to the Chuvash people, "Про девушку и про ужа" ("About the girl and the snake"), three sisters run to the shore to play and bathe in the water. The elder two leave the lake and, take their garments and go home. When the youngest sister leaves and looks for her garments, the maiden sees a huge snake sitting on her garments. The snake promises to give it back if she marries it. She agrees; the snake returns the garments and teaches her a command to summon him, Yaku. The snake takes her to his splendid underwater palace and reveals he must suffer some time under a curse: he is human under the snakeskin. She returns home to her family with dresses and money to give her sisters, and to wait for her husband to fetch her. The snake appears in a carriage to get his bride and take her to his underwater realm. Three years pass, and the snake's human wife has given birth to a boy and a girl. She insists on visiting her parents and showing them their grandchildren, but her husband warns that disaster may loom upon their family. The girl visits her family and one of her sisters asks her what she does to return to her palace in the bottom of the lake. The girl naïvely reveals the command to her sister, who goes to the shore of the lake, summons Yaku and kills him. When the snake's human wife returns to the shore, she sees a cut off snake head floating in the lake. She then enchants her son to become a beetle, her daughter a dragonfly, and herself a cuckoo.

Tatar people 
In a tale from the Tatar people titled "Зухра" ("Zuhra"), an old couple try to have a child, but none of their children survive, until they have a girl they name Zuhra. The couple keep her safe from the world, until she is fourteen years old, when some girls from the village enter the couple's house and beg for Zuhra to join them for playtime int he water. The old woman allows her daughters to join the others. Zuhra goes with the girls to bathe in a nearby lake and leaves her clothes on the shore. When she returns, a black snake ("Чёрный Змей", in the Russian translation) is lying on them and asks the girl to marry it. Afraid to utter any word, the Black Snake then assures her it will come back when she is eighteen, and slithers back into the lake. Zuhra runs back home and tells her mother everything, and they fence the house, hoping it will keep the snake out. However, when the time comes, the sky darkens and a retinue of snakes, jinns and peris come to Zuhra's house in their master's name. The Black Snake then appears and demands Zuhra as his bride. The girl agrees to come with him to the lake. The snake wraps itself around Zuhra, they both dive into the lake and swim until they reach a large gate. Past the gate, the snake uncoils itself, hits a golden staircase and becomes a human man. The man explains he was taken by the genie race when he was little, but evetntually became their leader, and the girl has nothing to fear. Zuhra accepts him and they marry. Three years pass, and Zuhra begins to miss home. She convinces her husband to let her go to the surface to visit her parents, and he gives her gold and silver to gift his mother-in-law. He also teaches her a command to summon him when she returns, and makes her promise to keep it a secret. Zuhra and her children go back to the surface world and visit the grandparents. After pestering her daughter with questions, Zuhra eventually tells her the secret command. The old woman places her grandchildren to bed, and, taking a saber, goes to the lake in the dead of night to summon the Black Snake (the "padishah of the jinn"). The Black Snake slithers off to the surface, and is beheaded by the old woman. She returns home. The next morning, Zuhra says her goodbyes to her mother and goes back to the lake. She tries to summon her husband, but, realizing something is wrong, she finds the snake's body. She buries it and curses her children to become a nightingale, a swallow and a starling, while herself becomes a dove.

Southern Europe

Bulgaria 
Tale type ATU 425M is reported in the Bulgarian Folktale Catalogue with the name "Невястата на змея проклина децата си" or "Die Frau des Drachen verflucht ihre Kinder" ("The Wife of the Dragon curses her children"): a dragon sits on the girl's garments in exchange for marrying her; they wed and move to his palace at the bottom of the sea, where she gives birth to two children; the girl visit her family with her children and her daughter betrays the dragon's secret, which leads to him being killed by his brothers-in-law; the girl then curses her children to become trees.

Central Europe
The tale is also said to be "very popular" in the Pomeranian region.

Central Asia
In a Kazakh variant, "Красавица Миржан и владыка подводного ханства" ("Beautiful Mirzhan and the Ruler of the Underwater Khanate"), Mirzhan, the beautiful only daughter of an old woman, is bathing in the water with some friends. Suddenly, a booming voice echoes from below the water asking the girl to marry it. The other girls flee in fear, while Mirzhan runs to the shore to get her clothes, but a snake sits on them. The snake asks the girl to be his wife and to live with him in his crystal palace. The girl accepts, if only to get her garments back. For the next week, her mother forbids her to set foot outside their yurt. However, a cadre of black snakes begins to slither out of the river to their house. The snakes take Mirzhan and disappear with her beneath the waters, as her mother grieves for her lost daughter. Some time later, as the old woman waits near the shore, she sees her daughter coming to her with two children, her sons. She explains she lives underwater and to return she only has to call on her husband's name: Ahmet. The old woman convinces her daughter to spend a night on her old home, while she goes in the dead of night to the shore to summon the snake spouse and kill him. The next morning, Mirzhan goes back to the shore to summon her husband, but she only sees a red tint in the river and her husband's head near the reeds. She then curses her daughter to become a swallow, her son a nightingale and herself into a cuckoo.

Latin America
Folklorist Terrence Hansen, in his catalogue of Latin American folktales, identified two tale types wherein a girl meets an enchanted fish and is taught magic to summon fish (in one type) or to bring fresh water (in the other). As the story continues, the girl's relatives imitate her voice to draw out the fish and kill it. In the first type, the girl drowns herself in the sea; in the other, she sinks to the ground after she sees the dead fish.

Africa
Africanist Sigrid Schmidt stated that in African tales, the secret song known only by heroine and husband and learned by others who use it to betray the couple "connects ... also with the East European tale of The Snake as Bridegroom".

Scholar Hasan El-Shamy lists 2 variants of the tale type found in Algeria, under the previous name of the type.

Professor Loreto Todd collected a West African (Cameroon) tale titled Bibaiyibaiyi an di papa-wata (Bibaiyibaiyi and the Papa-Water). In this tale, the heroine goes fishing and a creature named Papa-Water appears to her, intent on marrying her. Papa-Water gives her plenty of fish and teaches her a magic song to summon him and the fishes. A group of boys overhears the incantation and summons Papa-Water to kill him. The story was considered by folklorist Dan Ben-Amos as belonging to the type 425M. He also claimed that this narrative was "a common African variation on the Cupid and Psyche theme".

In another West African folktale from the Mandinga people, A noiva da serpente ("The Serpent's Bride"), there lived two sisters, Cumba and Sira. Sira bakes flour breads with "hydromel" (mead) to take to a mysterious person. Cumba follows her sister to a location near the water, and sees Sira chanting a song to summon an enchanted serpent from the waters. After Sira leaves, Cumba returns home to tell her mother everything. The girl returns to the beach with an armed man and sings the song of invocation. The serpent emerges from the water and is killed by the man. Later, Sira eats some food her mother prepared and a hen reveals it is made from the flesh of the serpent. Saddened with grief, she decides to enter the sea and a wave washes over her.

Parallels

Princess Himal and Nagaray

Indian scholar Suniti Kumar Chatterji summarized the Lithuanian tale and stated that it "reminded" him of the Kashmiri story about Princess Himal and Nagrai (Nāgaray), the Prince of Snakes. Indian scholarship states that the tale exists in the oral repertoire of the region, with multiple renditions appearing in both Persian and Kashmiri in the 18th and 19th centuries. In a variation of the story, Princess Himal is a human and her lover Nagaray is a nāga - a snake-like being that lives in a watery realm, and at the end of the tale deities Shiva and Parvati reunite both lovers by resurrecting their ashes in a magical spring.

Vodník (The Water Goblin)
Similarities can be found in Vodník, a story written by Czech author Karel Jaromír Erben as a poem in the book Kytice z pověstí národních ("A Bouquet of Folk Legends"). The poem is about a water goblin who is sitting on a poplar by his lake, singing to the moon and sewing clothes for his wedding soon to come. A mother tells her young daughter of a dream she had about clothing her daughter in white robes swirling like foaming water and with pearls of tears hiding deep distress around her neck. She warns her daughter not to go to the lake but the daughter is drawn to the lake anyway. She leaves for the lake to do her laundry. The moment she hands down her first garment into the water, the bridge on which she was sitting collapses. As the water engulfs her she is abducted by the water goblin. He takes her to his underwater castle and marries her. After the birth of their first child, the abducted wife sings it a lullaby about her past, which enrages the water goblin. She tries to calm him down and pleads to be allowed ashore to visit her mother once. He gives in on three conditions: She is not to embrace a single soul, not even her mother; she has to leave the baby behind as a hostage; and she will return by the bells of the evening vespers. The reunion of mother and daughter is very emotional and they eventually hug despite daughter's promise. When evening falls the mother forbids her daughter to go even when the bells are ringing. The water goblin gets angry and thumps on the door, ordering the girl to go with him because his dinner has to be made. When the mother tells him to go away and eat whatever he has for dinner in his lair, he knocks again, saying his bed needs to be made. Again the mother tells him to leave them alone, after which the goblin says their child is hungry and crying. To this plea the mother tells him to bring the child to them. In a furious rage the goblin returns to the lake and through the shrieking storm screams that pierce the soul are heard. The storm ends with a loud crash that stirs up the mother and her daughter. When opening the door the mother finds a tiny head without a body and a tiny body without a head lying in their blood on the doorstep of her hut.

Legacy

Toponyms
Studies suggest that characters of the tale named several geographic features, such as toponyms and hydronyms of northwestern Russia, Pskov region.

In the 19th century, Polish writer Aleksander Połujański published a study on the Augustów region, and suggested that two places, a lake named Jeglówek and a village named Jegliniec (where a Lithuanian fortress was previously located), were connected to the name Egle.

According to researcher Svetlana Ryzhakova, professor V. Kazakevičius stated that in the Polish region of Suwałki, a legend is told of a girl named Egle or Egla who married a snake being that lived in an underwater crystal palace.

Cultural references

Salomėja Nėris, a Lithuanian poet, wrote a poem called Eglė žalčių karalienė (1940), which is based on the motifs of the tale.

A bronze sculpture displaying Eglė and the Serpent by Robertas Antinis has been constructed in Palanga Botanical Garden, Lithuania in 1960.

A ballet Eglė žalčių karalienė by Eduardas Balsys and numerous plays have been staged in various Lithuanian theaters, for the first time in 1960, directed by Juozas Gustaitis.

The story has also inspired the creation of literary tales.

The tale also inspired a literary work by author Jēkabs Jūsmiņš (lv), in 1880, with the title Zalkša līgava.

A literary telling is attributed to Russian author Leo Tolstoy. In his tale, titled The Snake, the serpent lies on the smock of a girl named Masha. Masha marries the snake and returns from the sea to her mother's house with her two children. Masha's mother is the one to kill the snake husband with a hatchet. After seeing the dead husband, Masha curses her daughter to become a swallow, her son to be a nightingale and herself to be a cuckoo.

See also
 Jūratė and Kastytis
 Therianthropy, Shapeshifting, Monstrous bridegroom
 Daphne, Baucis and Philemon
 The Sea Tsar and Vasilisa the Wise
 The Frog Prince, about an amphibian paramour (ATU 440)
 King Lindworm, about a serpentine husband (ATU 433B)

Footnotes

References

Bibliography
 Kayanidi, L.G. (2020). “Structural and semantic typology of the metamorphic ornithological plot of an East Slavic tale (SUS 425М)”. In: Folklore: Structure, Typology, Semiotics, vol. 3, no. 1, p. 56-93. 
 
 Gintaras Beresnevičius. "Eglė žalčių karalienė" ir lietuvių teogoninis mitas: religinė istorinė studija. Vilnius, 2003.
 Martinkus-Zemp, Ada. Eglé, la reine des serpents: un conte lituanien. Institut d'ethnologie, Musée de l'homme. 1989.
 Salomėja Nėris. Eglė žalčių karalienė. Kaunas, 1940.
 Eugenijus Žmuida „Eglė žalčių karalienė“: gyvybės ir mirties domenas http://www.llti.lt/failai/12_Zmuidos.pdf
 Žmuida, Eugenijus. "Eglė žalčių karalienė: slibino ir mergelės motyvo kilmė" [Eglė, the queen of serpents: origins of the motif of dragon and maiden]. In: Liaudies kultūra Nr. 5 (2016). pp. 30–41. 
 Žmuida, Eugenijus. "Eglė žalčių karalienė: slibino ir mergelės motyvo kilmė" [Eglė, the queen of serpents: origins of the motif of dragon and maiden]. In: Liaudies kultūra Nr. 6 (2016), pp. 27–36.
 "«Le mari-couleuvre» ou Pourquoi le coucou coucoule". In: Kabakova, Galina. D’un conte l’autre. Paris: Flies France, 2018. pp. 60–84. .

Further reading

 Behr-Glinka, Andrei I. "Змея как сексуальный и брачный партнер человека. (Еще раз о семантике образа змеи в фольклорной традиции европейских народов)" [Serpent as a Bride and an Intimate Partner of a Man. Once more about the semantics of serpent in European folk-lore]. In: Культурные взаимодействия. Динамика и смыслы. Издательский дом Stratum, Университет «Высшая антропологическая школа», 2016. pp. 435–575.
 Bradūnas, Elena. ""IF YOU KILL A SNAKE — THE SUN WILL CRY". Folktale Type 425-M: A Study in Oicotype and Folk Belief". In: LITUANUS: Lithuanian Quarterly Journal of Arts and Sciences. Volume 21, No.1 - Spring 1975.
 Luven, Yvonne. "Eglè, die Königin der Nattern. Ein Schlangenmärchen als identitätsstiftende Erzählung der Balten". In: Bleckwenn, Helga (Hg.). Märchenfiguren in der Literatur des Nordund Ostseeraumes (Schriftenreihe Ringvorlesungen der Märchen-Stiftung Walther Kahn 11). Baltmannsweiler: Schneider Verlag Hohengehren, 2011. IX. pp. 66–92.
 Navickiene, Irena. "Les contes du peuple lituanien dans la littérature contemporaine". In: Les métamorphoses du conte. Recherches comparatives sur les livres et le multimédia d'enfance, no 2. Jean Perrot (or.); Institut international Charles Perrault. Bruxelles; New York: Lang, 2004. pp. 101–110. .
 Palmaitis, Letas. "Romeo Moses and Psyche Brunhild? Or Cupid the Serpent and the Morning Star?" In: Caucasologie et mythologie comparée, Actes du Colloque international du C.N.R.S. - IVe Colloque de Caucasologie (Sèvres, 27-29 juin 1988). Paris, PEETERS, 1992. pp. 177–185. 
 Sauka, Leonardas, sudarymas, rengėjas [com, cre]. Pasaka "Eglė žalčių karalienė". Tomas 1, Lietuvių variantai [First Tome: Lithuanian variants]. Vilnius: Lietuvių literatūros ir tautosakos institutas, 2007. 
 Sauka, Leonardas, sudarymas, rengėjas [com, cre]. Pasaka "Eglė žalčių karalienė". Tomas 2, Latvių variantai [Second Tome: Latvian variants]. Vilnius: Lietuvių literatūros ir tautosakos institutas, 2007. 
 Sauka, Leonardas, sudarymas, parengė [com, cre]. Pasaka "Eglė žalčių karalienė". Tomas 3, Finų, slavų, romanų, tiurkų variantai [Third Tome: Fairy tale "The Snake as Bridegroom" (ATU 425M) in Balto-Finnic, Slavic, Romanic and Turkic folklore]. Vilnius: Lietuvių literatūros ir tautosakos institutas, 2008. 
 Sauka, Leonardas, sudarymas, parengė [com, cre]. Pasaka "Eglė žalčių karalienė". Tomas 4, Tyrinėjimai, kitos žinios [Fourth Tome: research and other data]. Vilnius: Lietuvių literatūros ir tautosakos institutas, 2008. 
 Stryczyńska-Hodyl, Ewa. "Popularność motywu "O żonie węża" w folklorze i literaturze Bałtów". In: Perspectives of Baltic philology II. Edited by Jowita Niewulis-Grablunas, Justyna Prusinowska, Ewa Stryczyńska-Hodyl. Pozn, P. pp. 223–237.

External links
 About the myth of Eglė
 English translation of the tale (following Salomėja Neris' version)
 Artist’s rendering of Eglė
 Another translation of the tale
 A version of the tale from Suwalski, Poland (In Polish)

European folklore
Lithuanian mythology
Lithuanian folklore characters
Lithuanian fairy tales
Love stories
Fiction about shapeshifting
Trees in mythology
Legendary serpents
Female legendary creatures
ATU 400-459